STIKFAS are 3.25-inch (8 cm) model assembly figures/toys made by Stikfas Pte. Ltd, a company based in Singapore. Once assembled, they can be customized with stickers (packaged as Stickers) and different pieces from other sets. The design principle behind STIKFAS is that all of the joints are ball/sockets and offer pose-ability, interchangeability, and articulation.

Stikfas are sold as "kits" that include accessories, Stikers, and sometimes additional models (dragon, dog, cat, bike, horse, octopus...) to accentuate the "theme" of each kit.

Stikfas company history
The debut of STIKFAS was through a successful co-branding in 2001 with the computer game publisher Electronic Arts. This collaboration provided proof of concept and STIKFAS Pte. Ltd. was incorporated in August. Work began on the first mass-production model of the STIKFAS Action Figure Kit, which was made available to the public through online sales at www.stikfas.com in December 2001.

From 2002 to 2004, STIKFAS was licensed to Hasbro Inc. This move saw an increase in its product range, distribution network, and market recognition. During this period, STIKFAS was awarded the title of "Best Original Concept" in "Best of the Best 2002" by Wizard's Toyfare magazine, the industry's leading publication. That year, STIKFAS came in second for "Most Fun and Innovative Toy" in Toyshop Magazine's consumer poll.

STIKFAS debuted in Japan in the fall of 2003 under the distribution of Tomy Direct Co., Ltd. In February 2005, the first comprehensive fan book about STIKFAS, its products, and the people in the company was published by Hobby Japan, the nation's leading hobby magazine since 1969. This publication reinforced the cult status that STIKFAS had in Japan.

STIKFAS kits
As of June 2006, different kits have been released, including Recolors (where only the colors of the parts have changed). Also, numerous different blisters, consisting of a single figure and no accessories, have been released.

STIKFAS webcomics
The pose-ability and customizability of STIKFAS action figures have attracted the attention of the online webcomic community. Several artists use out-of-the-box or customized STIKFAS as characters in continued webcomic adventures. The exceptional articulation enables nearly boundless expressions through body language, while the blank slate faces provide unlimited facial options using Stickers, clay, paint, and/or digital tools. Within these webcomics, customizations to the blank STIKFAS include the addition of hair, facial features, and clothing. Clay, cloth, yarn, thread, and paper are the most common customizing materials. The comics also frequently include unique sets and props, often created by the artist or merely commandeered from other toy lines (Playmobil, Lego blocks, Megabloks, and so on).

Stop motion animation
Because of the "ultra pose-ability" of the Stikfas figures, they have also been widely used to create independent stop motion animation films. Stop motion film examples:

The Stikfas company has hosted yearly stop motion contests at the Comic-Con Convention since 2007.

Stikfas also have small square notches on their bodies, allowing rare earth magnets to be inserted. These notches can be found on the upper legs, feet, and upper body sections. The curved U-shaped hands are also the same diameter as the notches. Once inserted into any of these areas, the magnets allow the Stikfas to be posed while adhering to a magnetic surface so they won't fall over.

Stikfas glue
Stikfas had been used as a product name before, completely unrelated to the current toy figures.  Lee Kuan Yew helped develop a glue based on tapioca, which he sold under the name Stikfas in Japanese-occupied Singapore during World War II.  Lee Kuan Yew would later serve as the Prime Minister of Singapore for more than three decades.

References

External links
 Stikfas Home Page (link dead)

Toy brands